NA-136 Okara-II is a constituency for the National Assembly of Pakistan.

Members of Parliament

2018-2022: NA-142 Okara-II

Election 2002 

General elections were held on 10 Oct 2002. Rao Sikandar Iqbal  of PPP won by 63,713 votes.

Election 2008 

General elections were held on 18 Feb 2008. Sajid Ul Hassan an Independent candidate won by 77,795 votes.

Election 2013 
 Elections were held on 11 May 2013 Muhammad Arif Ch of Pakistan Muslim League N won by 103,868  votes and became the  member of National Assembly.

By-election 2015

Election 2018 

General elections were held on 25 July 2018.

See also 
NA-135 Okara-I
NA-137 Okara-III

References

External links 
 Election result's official website

NA-144